Sean Gatewood (born August 7, 1980) was a Democratic member of the Kansas House of Representatives, representing the 57th district in Kansas, from 2009 to 2013. He is a graduate of Fort Hays State University.

Committee membership
 Commerce and Labor 2009-2010
 Vision 2020 2009-2010
 Veterans, Military and Homeland Security 2009-2010
 Government Efficiency and Fiscal Oversight 2009-2010
 Taxation 2011-2012
 Children and Families 2011-2012 (Ranking Member)
 Federal and State Affairs 2011-2012

Major donors
The top 5 donors to Gatewood's 2008 campaign were mostly labor groups:
1. Gatewood, Sean 	$4,352
2. Laborers Local 1290 	$500 	
3. Kansas National Education Assoc 	$500
4. Local 1445 Carpenters Union 	$500 	
5. United Steelworkers 307 	$500

References

External links
 Kansas Legislature - Sean Gatewood
 Project Vote Smart profile
 Kansas Votes profile
 Campaign contributions: 2008

Democratic Party members of the Kansas House of Representatives
Living people
21st-century American politicians
Fort Hays State University alumni
1980 births